Eucalyptus splendens, commonly known as apple jack, is a species of small, spreading tree that is endemic to a small area of Victoria, Australia. It has fibrous or corky bark on the trunk and thicker branches, lance-shaped to curved adult leaves, flower buds in groups of seven, white flowers and hemispherical to cup-shaped fruit.

Description
It has rough, firm to corky fibrous bark on the trunk and larger branches, smooth light brown bark on the thin branches. The branchlets are conspicuously yellow.

Taxonomy and naming
Eucalyptus splendens was first formally described in 1996 by Kevin James Rule in the journal Muelleria. The specific epithet (splendens) is a Latin word meaning "shining", "gleaming" or brilliant", referring to the bright green juvenile leaves.

Distribution
This eucalypt is only known from a single location near Mount Richmond, north-west of Portland, where it grows in heavy soils of volcanic origin.

See also
List of Eucalyptus species

References

Flora of Victoria (Australia)
Trees of Australia
splendens
Myrtales of Australia
Plants described in 1996